Otepää Upland is hilly area of higher elevation in Southern Estonia.

Upland's area is about 1200 km2.

The highest point of upland is Kuutsemägi (217 m).

Part of upland is taken under protection (Otepää Nature Park).

References

Hills of Estonia
Valga County